Giraffa jumae is an extinct species of even-toed ungulate in the Giraffidae family. The species ranged from Malawi to Chad with a possible occurrence of the species or a closely related species found in Turkey.  The type specimen was discovered during trenching excavations on the upper member of the Rawi Formation by Louis Leakey in the 1930s.  The specimen was found with Ceratotherium simum, Suidae such as Metridiochoerus andrewsi, a Hippopotamus gorgops, and a nearly complete pygmy hippopotamus mandible.

 
The species is considered a possible ancestor to the modern giraffes.

References

Pliocene mammals of Africa
Pleistocene mammals of Africa
Prehistoric giraffes
Pleistocene even-toed ungulates
Pleistocene species extinctions
Fossil taxa described in 1967